At least two ships of the Hellenic Navy have borne the name Poseidon, after the ancient Greek god of the sea Poseidon:

  a  launched as USS Lapon in 1942 she was renamed on transfer to Greece in 1957. She was stricken in 1976.
  a Type 209 submarine commissioned in 1979.

Hellenic Navy ship names